The Law is the second studio album by American heavy metal band Exhorder, released on  March 15, 1992 through Roadrunner Records. In this album, the band's sound became much more groove metal-oriented and the thrash influences as heard on Slaughter in the Vatican were reduced. It was reissued by Roadrunner in 2003 in a two-disc set with Slaughter in the Vatican and again in 2008. The song "Into the Void" is a cover of a Black Sabbath song off their Master of Reality album.

Critical reception

In 2005, The Law was ranked number 273 in Rock Hard magazine's book of The 500 Greatest Rock & Metal Albums of All Time.

Track listing

Personnel
Kyle Thomas – vocals
Vinnie LaBella – lead guitar
Jay Ceravolo – rhythm guitar
Franky Sparcello – bass
Chris Nail – drums

Additional personnel
Rob Beaton – production, engineering, mixing 
Jay Ceravolo – assistant engineering, mixing
Ty Bouvier – design
Kurt Coste – photography
Ed Lancaster – artwork 
Patricia Mooney – art direction   
Eddy Schreyer – mastering 
Trina Shoemaker – assistant engineering

References

Exhorder albums
Roadrunner Records albums
1992 albums